Hordeum patagonicum is a species of barley native to Argentina, where it can be found in inland wetlands, coastal and supratidal lands. This is a small annual grass forming petite patches of thin, hairy leaves and erect stems to about 10 cm height. First described by Lucien Leon Hauman, it received its current name by Guillermo Covas. H. patagonicum is included in the same family as grass. No subspecies are listed in the Catalog of Life.

References 

patagonic